Jackson County Jail may refer to:

Places in the United States
Jackson County Jail (Newport, Arkansas), formerly listed on the NRHP
Jackson County Jail (Andrew, Iowa), listed on the NRHP in Jackson County, Iowa
Jackson County Jail and Marshal's House, Independence, Missouri, NRHP-listed

Film
Jackson County Jail (film), a 1976 film starring Yvette Mimieux and Tommy Lee Jones